The 2012–13 Kent Football League season (known as the 2012–13 Hurliman Kent Football League for sponsorship reasons) was the 47th in the history of Kent Football League, a football competition in England. At the end of the season the league changed its name to the Southern Counties East Football League, to reflect that many of its member clubs no longer played within the county boundaries of Kent.

League table

The league consisted of 15 clubs from the previous season along with two new clubs:
Rochester United (formerly Bly Spartans), promoted from the Kent Invicta League
Whyteleafe, relegated from the Isthmian League

From this league, only Erith & Belvedere, Erith Town, Tunbridge Wells, VCD Athletic and Whyteleafe applied for promotion.

For this season only, the FA were to promote a second club from two of the following six Step 5 leagues: Combined Counties League, Eastern Counties League, Essex Senior League, Kent League, Spartan South Midlands League and the Sussex County League. This was to fulfil the expansion of the Isthmian League Divisions One North and South from 22 to 24 clubs each. The two clubs were to be promoted on a points per game basis, and the two runners-up with the best PPG were VCD Athletic (Kent Football League) and Guernsey (Combined Counties League). Three others – Aylesbury United (Spartan South Midlands League), Redhill (Sussex County League) and Barkingside (Essex Senior League) – were also confirmed as promoted by the FA on 17 May, due to resignations and non-promotions elsewhere.

League table

Results

References

External links
 Kent Football League

2012-13
9